{{DISPLAYTITLE:Pi2 Orionis}}

Pi2 Orionis (π2 Ori, π2 Orionis) is the Bayer designation for a solitary star in the equatorial constellation of Orion. Although the Bright Star Catalogue lists this as a spectroscopic binary star system, this does not appear to be the case. It is visible to the naked eye with an apparent visual magnitude of 4.35. Based upon an annual parallax shift of 14.53 mas, it is located roughly 224 light-years away from the Sun.

This is an A-type main-sequence star with a stellar classification of A1 Vn, where the 'n' indicates broad absorption lines due to rotation. It is spinning rapidly with a projected rotational velocity of 261.4 km/s. This is giving the star an oblate shape with an equatorial bulge that is 13% larger than the polar radius.

References

A-type main-sequence stars
Orion (constellation)
Orionis, Pi2
Orionis, 02
030739
022509
01544
Durchmusterung objects